Sclerodoris coriacea is a species of sea slug, a dorid nudibranch, shell-less marine opisthobranch gastropod mollusks in the family Discodorididae.

Distribution
This species was described from a cave near Chuaka, on the east coast of Zanzibar, East Africa.

References

Discodorididae
Gastropods described in 1904